Johanna Maria Tõugu (born 3 September 1999 in Tallinn) is an Estonian environmentalist and politician who is co-leader of the Estonian Greens. She is leading her party into the 2023 parliamentary election.

References 

1999 births
Living people
21st-century Estonian politicians
21st-century Estonian women politicians
Estonian Greens politicians
Leaders of political parties in Estonia
Estonian environmentalists
Politicians from Tallinn